José Antônio Pereira (born March 19, 1984 in Monte Azul Paulista), or simply Zé Antônio, is a Brazilian footballer, who plays as a midfielder.

Career statistics

Club

Honours
Brazilian League (2nd division): 2006
Minas Gerais State League: 2007
  Campeonato Pernambucano in 2010 with Sport Recife

External links
 
 CBF 
 footballbusiness 
 websoccerclub

References

1984 births
Living people
Footballers from São Paulo (state)
Brazilian footballers
Brazilian expatriate footballers
Botafogo Futebol Clube (SP) players
Clube Atlético Mineiro players
BK Häcken players
Club Athletico Paranaense players
Sport Club do Recife players
Goiás Esporte Clube players
Associação Portuguesa de Desportos players
Paysandu Sport Club players
Guarani FC players
Clube Atlético Linense players
Figueirense FC players
Esporte Clube Santo André players
Joinville Esporte Clube players
Association football midfielders
Brazilian expatriate sportspeople in Sweden
Expatriate footballers in Sweden